The Colgate Raiders represented Colgate University in ECAC women's ice hockey during the 2017–18 NCAA Division I women's ice hockey season.  The season featured Colgate's first ECAC regular season championship, tied with Clarkson, and their first trip to the NCAA Tournament. The Raiders went all the way to the NCAA Championship, losing in overtime to their ECAC rival, Clarkson. In February, the team was ranked first in the nation by both national polls.

Offseason

August 17:  Annika Zalewski was drafted by the Buffalo Beauts in the NWHL, as the 14th overall pick.

Recruiting

Roster

2017-18 Raiders

Schedule

|-
!colspan=12 style="background:#862633;color:white;"| Regular Season

|-
!colspan=12 style="background:#862633;color:white;"| ECAC Tournament

|-
!colspan=12 style="background:#862633;color:white;"| NCAA Tournament

Awards and honors
Head Coach Greg Fargo was named AHCA Coach of the Year
Lauren Wildfang was chosen to the All-ECAC First Team, while Jessie Eldridge was named to the second team, and Julia Vandyk and Shae Labbe to the third team.

References

Colgate
Colgate Raiders women's ice hockey seasons
NCAA women's ice hockey Frozen Four seasons